Barri Sharqi also spelled Berri Sharqi) is a town in northern Syria, administratively part of the Hama Governorate, located east of Hama at the edge of the Syrian Desert.  Nearby localities include Tell al-Tut and district center Salamiyah to the west, Aqarib to the north, Suha and Uqayribat to the east and al-Mukharram to the south. According to the Syria Central Bureau of Statistics, Barri Sharqi had a population of 4,172 in the 2004 census. In 1838 it was classified as a khirba ("ruined village") by English scholar Eli Smith.

References

Bibliography

Populated places in Salamiyah District
Towns in Syria